Donovan Wilson (born February 21, 1995) is an American football safety for the Dallas Cowboys of the National Football League (NFL). He played college football at Texas A&M.

Early years
Wilson attended Woodlawn High School in Shreveport, Louisiana. As a senior, he had 70 tackles, 13 interceptions, 5 forced fumbles, 57 receptions for 860 yards and 9 touchdowns, while receiving Shreveport Defensive Player of the Year and  Class 4A All-state honors.

College career
He accepted a football scholarship from Texas A&M University. As a true freshman, he appeared in 10 games as a backup safety, making 19 tackles (2 for loss). He started in the 2014 Liberty Bowl, leading the team with 9 tackles.

As a sophomore, he started 7 games as a nickel defensive back. He collected 63 tackles (8.5 for loss), 5 interceptions (led the team), 3 pass breakups, 2 sacks, one quarterback hurry, 3 forced fumbles and 2 fumble recoveries. He had 10 tackles against the University of Mississippi.

As a junior, he started 7 games as a nickel defensive back, registering 59 tackles (5.5 for loss), one interception, 2 quarterback hurries and 2 pass breakups. He had 9 tackles both against Auburn University and Louisiana State University.

In 2017, he suffered a season-ending ankle injury in the season opener against UCLA. As a redshirt senior in 2018, he was a regular starter at safety (11 out of 12 games), posting 66 tackles (second on the team), 4.5 tackles for loss, 2 interceptions (led the team), 5 pass breakups and 2 sacks. He had 12 tackles against the University of Kentucky. He made 13 tackles (7 solo) against Louisiana State University.

Professional career

2019
Wilson was selected by the Dallas Cowboys in the sixth round (213th overall) of the 2019 NFL Draft. He missed the first two games of the season with an ankle injury. He played mostly on special teams and had 3 tackles.

2020
In Week 4 against the Cleveland Browns, Wilson took over the strong safety position, after replacing Darian Thompson, when he failed to defend a 37-yard touchdown trick pass from Jarvis Landry to fellow wide receiver Odell Beckham Jr. on the first drive of the game. Wilson recorded 10 tackles, his first career sack on Baker Mayfield and showed a hard-hitting physical style during the 49–38 loss, earning the full time starter position. 

In Week 8 against the Philadelphia Eagles on Sunday Night Football, Wilson recorded a strip sack on Carson Wentz that he also recovered during the 23–9 loss. In week 11 against the Vikings, Wilson had the best game a Dallas safety has had since the days of Darren Woodson when he created two turnovers. 
In Week 11 against the Minnesota Vikings, Wilson and teammate DeMarcus Lawrence had a strip sack on quarterback Kirk Cousins that was recovered by Wilson.  Later in the game, Wilson forced a fumble on running back Dalvin Cook that was recovered by Lawrence during the 31–28 win.

In Week 12, against the Washington Football Team, he made 10 tackles (9 solo). Wilson would later miss Week 13 and 14 with a groin strain injury and was replaced with Thompson at the strong safety position.

In Week 15 against the San Francisco 49ers, he returned to the starter role and made his first career interception off a pass thrown by Nick Mullens during the 41–33 win.
In Week 17 against the New York Giants, Wilson recorded a sack on Daniel Jones and also intercepted a pass thrown by Jones during the 23–19 loss. He finished with 71 tackles, two interceptions, three passes defended, 3.5 sacks, three forced fumbles and two fumble recoveries.

2021
Wilson entered the 2021 season as the Cowboys starting strong safety. He was placed on injured reserve on November 24, 2021 with shoulder and chest injuries. He was activated on December 25.

2022
Starting in every game, Wilson enjoyed a career-best season in 2022; he recorded a team-best 101 total tackles, 5 sacks, one interception, two pass breakups, forced two fumbles and recovered one fumble, and four tackles for loss.

2023
On March 14, 2023, Wilson signed a three-year, $21 million contract extension with the Cowboys.

References

External links
Texas A&M Aggies bio

1995 births
Living people
Players of American football from Shreveport, Louisiana
American football safeties
Texas A&M Aggies football players
Dallas Cowboys players